Mid-Continent Airport may refer to:
Wichita Dwight D. Eisenhower National Airport (IATA: ICT), formerly known as Wichita Mid-Continent Airport, in Wichita, Kansas
Kansas City International Airport (IATA: MCI) in Kansas City, Missouri